The following lists events that happened in 1966 in Iceland.

Incumbents
President – Ásgeir Ásgeirsson
Prime Minister – Bjarni Benediktsson

Events

Births

27 February – Baltasar Kormákur, actor, theater and film director, and film producer
10 March – Margrét Vilhjálmsdóttir, actress
23 May – Árni Páll Árnason, politician.
31 August – Eagle Egilsson, cinematographer and television director
27 September – Sigurður Jónsson, footballer
12 October – Hanna Birna Kristjánsdóttir, politician.
3 December – Ólöf Nordal, politician

Deaths

References

 
1960s in Iceland
Iceland
Iceland
Years of the 20th century in Iceland